The following list includes settlements, geographic features, and political subdivisions of Alaska whose names are derived from Native American languages.

Listings

Boroughs and census areas

 Aleutians West and Aleutians East Borough
 Kenai Peninsula Borough – from the Dena'ina phrase dena, meaning "flat meadow" or "open area with few trees".
 Shared with the city of Kenai.
 Ketchikan Gateway Borough – from the Tlingit phrase kichx̱áan, whose English translation is unclear.
 Shared with the city of Ketchikan.
 Kodiak Island Borough – from the Alutiiq phrase qikertaq, meaning "island".
 Shared with the island of Kodiak, and its largest city Kodiak.
 Matanuska-Susitna Borough
 The City and Borough of Sitka – from the Tlingit phrase shee at'iká, meaning "people on the outside of Baranof Island".
 The Municipality and Borough of Skagway – from the Tlingit phrase sha-ka-géi, meaning "a windy place with white caps on the water".
 The City and Borough of Yakutat – from the Tlingit phrase yaakwdáat, meaning "the place where canoes rest".
 Shared with the neighboring Yakutat Bay.

Settlements

 Adak – from the Aleut phrase adaax, whose English translation is unclear.
 Shared with Adak Island
 Alakanuk – from the Yupik phrase alakanuk, meaning "wrong way".
 Akutan – from the Aleut phrase achan-ingiiga, whose English translation is unclear.
 Shared with Akutan Bay, Mount Akutan, Akutan Island and the Akutan Hot Springs.
 Chevak – from the Cup'ik phrase cev'aq, meaning "cut-through channel".
 Eklutna – from the Dena'ina phrase idluytnu, meaning "river of objects".
 Shared with the Eklutna River and Eklutna Lake.
 Emmonak – from the Yup'ik phrase imangaq, whose English translation is unclear.
 Hoonah – from the Tlingit phrase xunaa, meaning "leeward of the north wind".
 Klawock – from the Tlingit phrase ɬawa:k, the name given to a subgroup of the Tlingit tribe.
 Kotlik – from the Yup'ik phrase qerrulliik, whose English translation is unclear.
 Kwethluk – from the Yup'ik phrase kuiggluk, meaning "unnatural river".
 Noorvik – from the Iñupiaq phrase nuurvik, meaning "a place to move to".
 Nunapitchuk – from the Yup'ik phrase nunapicuar, whose English translation is unclear.
 Quinhagak – from the Yup'ik phrase kuinerraq, meaning "new river channel".
 Savoonga – from the Yup'ik phrase sivungaq, whose English translation is unclear.
 Selawik – from the Iñupiaq phrase siiḷivik, meaning "the place of sheefish".
 Shared with the nearby Selawik Lake.
 Toksook Bay – from the Yup'ik phrase tuqsuk, whose English translation is unclear.
 Unalakleet – from the Iñupiaq phrase uŋalaqłiq, meaning "from the southern side".
 Unalaska – from the Aleut phrase ounalashka, meaning "near the peninsula".
 Shared with Unalaska Island.
 Utqiagvik – from the Iñupiaq phrase ukpik, meaning "the place where snowy owls are hunted".
 Wasilla – named after the eponymous Dena'ina chief.

Bodies of water

 Binnyanaktuk Creek – from an Iñupiaq phrase meaning "superlatively rugged".
 Iliamna Lake – from the Dena'ina phrase nila vena, meaning "lake of the island".
 Ipnek Creek – from an Iñupiaq phrase meaning "sheep".
 Kapoon Creek – named after an Inuit resident from Wiseman.
 Karillyukpuk Creek – from an Iñupiaq phrase meaning "very rugged".
 Kenunga Creek – from an Iñupiaq phrase meaning "knife edge".
 Kinnorutin Creek – from an Iñupiaq phrase meaning "you are crazy".
 Kupuk Creek – named after an Inuit resident from Wiseman.
 Mashooshalluk Creek – from an Iñupiaq phrase meaning "wild potato plant".
 Nutirwik Creek – named after an Inuit hunter.
 Pamichtuk Lake – from an Iñupiaq phrase meaning "other".
 Pegeeluk Creek – from an Iñupiaq phrase meaning "not very good".
 Publituk Creek – from an Iñupiaq phrase meaning "hollow, drumlike sound made when walking on shell ice".
 Shukok Creek – from an Iñupiaq phrase meaning "rock found on a creek".
 Teshekpuk Lake – from the Iñupiaq phrase tasiqpak, meaning "large lagoon".
 Tobuk Creek – named after an Inuit resident from Alatna.

Islands

 Aagumchiidalix Island
 Aalikam Tangii Island
 Adugak Island
 Afognak Island
 Agattu Island
 Aiktak Island
 Akun Island
 Amak Island
 Mount Amak
 Amaknak Island
 Amatignak Island
 Amchitka Island
 Amukta Island
 Mount Amukta
 Unalga Island – from the Aleut phrase unalĝa, whose English translation is unclear.
 Shared with another Unalga Island in the Delarof Islands.
 Unga Island – from the Aleut phrase uĝnaasaqax̂, whose English translation is unclear.
 Unimak Island – from the Aleut phrase unimax, whose English translation is unclear.

Other

 Alapah Mountain – from an Iñupiaq phrase meaning "cold".
 Amawk Mountain – from an Iñupiaq phrase meaning "wolf".
 Apoon Mountain – from an Iñupiaq phrase meaning "snow".
 Arrigetch Peaks – from an Iñupiaq phrase meaning "fingers outstretched".
 Denali, Denali National Park – from Koyukon deenaalee, "the tall one" (with -naał-, "be long/tall").
 Katiktak Mountain – from an Iñupiaq phrase meaning "white".
 Kollutuk Mountain – from an Iñupiaq phrase meaning "sheep horn dipper".
 Mount Doonerak – from an Iñupiaq phrase meaning "spirit mountain".
 Nahtuk Mountain – from an Iñupiaq phrase meaning "owl".
 Oolah Mountain – from an Iñupiaq phrase meaning "ulu (scraping tool)".
 Oxadak Mountain – named after an Inuit elder.
 Sukakpak Mountain – from an Iñupiaq phrase meaning "marten deadfall".

See also
List of place names in the United States of Native American origin

References

Citations

Sources

 Bright, William (2004). Native American Placenames of the United States. Norman: University of Oklahoma Press. .

 
 
Place names